Åmål Municipality (Åmåls kommun) is a municipality in Västra Götaland County in western Sweden. Its seat is located in the city of Åmål.

The present municipality was created in 1971 through the amalgamation of the former City of Åmål and the former rural municipality of Tössbo (the latter created in 1952).

Geography and natural resources
The city of Åmål is located in a scenic bay of Lake Vänern, the largest lake in Sweden. The municipality has a small archipelago with some 30 islands, called Tösse skärgård, to the south of the city. The islands are protected as a nature preserve; many of the islands are wooded, but a few are used for farming. They provide habitat for a number of bird species, including grey heron, osprey, mallard, goldeneye, goosander, the black-throated diver and hobby in the bays; on the cobs are colonies of herring gull, and the common tern; while on the fir-covered islands are capercaillie, woodpeckers and other birds.

Population centers in the municipality include Åmål, Fengersfors, and Tösse.

Economy
Fishing was once a major industry, as indicated by the fish appearing on the bottom of the coat of arms. Logging was also of importance. In recent years tourism, especially activities connected to the use of the lake, have increased.

Sister cities
Åmål has seven twin towns:

References

External links

Åmål Municipality - Official site
 Article Åmål - From Nordisk Familjebok

Municipalities of Västra Götaland County
North Älvsborg